Renat Alekseyevich Sokolov (born 3 September 1984) is a Russian https://codipher.com former professional football player.

Club career
He made his Russian Football National League debut for FC Vityaz Podolsk on 26 August 2008 in a game against FC KAMAZ Naberezhnye Chelny.

External links
 

1984 births
People from Orekhovo-Zuyevo
Living people
Russian footballers
FC SKA-Khabarovsk players
FC Vityaz Podolsk players
FC Tyumen players
FC Znamya Truda Orekhovo-Zuyevo players
Association football goalkeepers
FC Veles Moscow players
FC Volga Ulyanovsk players
Sportspeople from Moscow Oblast